The following squads and players competed in the European Women's Handball Championship in 2000 in Romania.

Austria 

 Nataliya Rusnatchenko
 Kathrin Gaksch
 Birgit Engl 
 Stephanie Ofenböck 
 Katrin Engel
 Alexandra Materzok 
 Nina Winter
 Erika Schweighofer
 Ariane Maier
 Laura Fritz 
 Barbara Strass 
 Barbara Wondrasch
 Magdalena Materzok
 Edith Mika
 Nadine Urban

Belarus 

 Natallia Petrakova
 Raisa Tsikhanovich 
 Alla Matushkovitz
 Larysa Mezhinskaya
 Elena Koulik 
 Tatsiana Famenka
 Hanna Halynskaya 
 Tatsiana Silitch 
 Tatsiana Khlimankova 
 Irinna Kalpakova 
 Svetlana Minevskaia 
 Natalia Anisimova
 Natalia Tsvirko
 Natalia Siarko

Denmark 

 Lene Rantala
 Karin Mortensen
 Majken Larsen
 Mette Vestergaard 
 Christina Roslyng Hansen 
 Pernille Hansen
 Rikke Hörlykke Jörgensen
 Anja Nielsen 
 Lotte Faldborg Kiaerskou 
 Winnie Mölgaard
 Rikke Erhardsen Skov  
 Line Daugaard 
 Louise Pedersen
 Merethe Hansen

France 
 Joanne Dudziak
 Valérie Nicolas
 Estelle Vogein 
 Leila Duchemann-Lejeune 
 Sandrine Delerce-Mariot 
 Melinda Jacques-Szabo 
 Nodjialem Myaro 
 Véronique Pecqueux-Rolland
 Stéphanie Cano 
 Isabelle Wendling
 Seynabou Benga
 Raphaëlle Tervel 
 Chantal Maio
 Marie-Annick Dezert
 Myriame Said Mohamed

Germany 

 Eike Bram
 Silke Christiansen
 Ingrida Radzeviciute 
 Grit Jurack 
 Annika Schafferus 
 Alexandra Uhlig 
 Nikola Pietzsch 
 Melanie Schliecker 
 Kathrin Blacha 
 Franziska Heinz
 Heike Schmidt 
 Agnieszka Tobiasz 
 Heike Ahlgrimm
 Anke Schulz
 Janet Grunow
 Sylvia Harlander

Hungary 

 Tímea Sugár
 Katalin Pálinger
 Anikó Kántor
 Zsuzsanna Pálffy
 Nikolett Brigovácz
 Krisztina Nagy
 Ildikó Pádár
 Anita Kulcsár
 Beáta Siti
 Eszter Siti
 Judit Simics
 Ágnes Farkas
 Krisztina Pigniczki
 Erika Kirsner
 Beatrix Kökény
 Gabriella Kindl

Macedonia 

 Oksana Maslova
 Gordana Naceva
 Biljana Crvenkoska
 Dana Filipovska 
 Anzela Platon
 Mirjana Cupic 
 Valentina Radulovic Tarculovska
 Marina Abramova 
 Larisa Ferzalieva 
 Klara Boeva 
 Mileva Velkova 
 Natalia Todorovska
 Marija Papudzieva

Norway 

 Mimi J. Kopperud Slevigen
 Hege Anett Pettersson
 Kristine Duvholt Havnas 
 Cecilie Louise Thorsteinsen 
 Else-Marthe Sörlie-Lybekk 
 Monica Sandve 
 Camilla Nordberg Thorsen
 Gro Hammerseng 
 Birgitte Saettem 
 Elisabeth Hilmo
 Marianne Rokne 
 Camilla Carstens
 Hege Vikebö
 Karoline Dyhre Breivang
 Vigdis Haarsaker
 Jeanett Nielsen

Romania 

 Cristina Maria Dogaru
 Luminita Hutupan
 Carmen Liliana Nitescu
 Mihaela Ignat 
 Cristina Nicoleta Gisca
 Cristina Dumitrescu
 Simona Silvia Gogirla 
 Victorina Bora 
 Cristina Georgiana Varzaru 
 Steluta Luca
 Alina Ariton
 Aurelia Stoica
 Marinela Patru
 Madalina Straton
 Elena Roxana Gheorghe

Russia 

 Tatiana Alizar
 Inna Suslina
 Tatiana Diadetchko 
 Oksana Romenskaya 
 Natalia Gontcharova 
 Olga Buyanova
 Liudmila Bodnieva 
 Nadezda Muravyeva
 Anna Ignattchenko 
 Olena Yakovleva
 Irina Poltoratskaya 
 Marina Naukovich 
 Nigina Saidova
 Inna Volkova
 Nadezhda Konnova
 Anna Kareeva

Ukraine 

 Nataliya Borysenko
 Tetyana Vorozhtsova
 Olga Popovich
 Liliya Stolpakova 
 Tetiana Brabinko-Salogub
 Maryna Vergelyuk 
 Ganna Syukalo 
 Tetyana Yaresko
 Olena Tsyhytsia 
 Olena Reznir 
 Galyna Markushevska
 Olena Radchenko 
 Irina Honcharova
 Larysa Kharlanyuk
 Olena Yatsenko

Yugoslavia 

 Zlata Paplacko
 Branka Jovanovic
 Tatjana Medved
 Tanja Milanovic 
 Sandra Kolakovic 
 Sanja Jovovic 
 Snezana Damjanac 
 Maja Savic 
 Bojana Petrovic 
 Milanka Celebic
 Tatjana Jeraminok 
 Dragica Milickovic
 Aida Selmanovic
 Emina Krasnic
 Jelena Nisavic

References 

European Handball Championship squads